The Kan Cabinet was the cabinet governing Japan from June 2010 to September 2011 under the leadership of Prime Minister Naoto Kan, who came into power after winning the DPJ leadership election in June 2010. The Kan Cabinet oversaw the response to the aftermath of the 2011 Tōhoku earthquake and tsunami and the scaling-down of Japan's nuclear energy dependence following the nuclear disaster at TEPCO's Fukushima Daiichi nuclear power plant.

Political background 
The previous Prime Minister and DPJ president, Yukio Hatoyama resigned on 2 June 2010 on the background of an unpopular deal with the United States to retain the American military base in Okinawa and the DPJ's low poll numbers. Hatoyama's resignation triggered a DPJ presidential election, which was won by Finance Minister Naoto Kan. On 8 June, Kan was formally appointed by the Emperor as Japan's 94th Prime Minister. The new prime minister conducted a cabinet reshuffle and promoted some senior party members to important portfolios, notable Yoshihiko Noda to the Ministry of Finance and Yoshito Sengoku to the Cabinet Secretariat. Kan became the second DPJ prime minister in just eight months.

In spite of a temporary recovery in approval ratings, the government lost its majority in the House of Councillors in the July 2010 election and was subsequently dependent on parts of the opposition for getting any bill through the now-divided Diet.

His government poorly handled the response to the massive earthquake and tsunami in northeast Japan. The following nuclear accidents at private utility company TEPCO's nuclear power plant in Fukushima spurred the government to change the course of Japan's energy policy. Reversing the pro-nuclear policy of the previous administrations, Kan's government pushed for a conversion to renewable energy and eventual shut-down of Japan's nuclear plants. Japan's nuclear power plants were completely shut down by May 2012, leaving Japan without nuclear-generated electricity for the first time since 1970. Several of the plants were only brought back online after the DPJ was no longer in government. The LDP government led by Shinzo Abe gradually reopened the nuclear plants, starting with Sendai Nuclear Power Plant in Kyushu in August 2015. The restart has been slow due to legal challenges and heavy domestic opposition.

Election of the Prime Minister

Lists of ministers 

R = Member of the House of Representatives
C = Member of the House of Councillors
 N = Non-Diet member
Italics denote acting minister

Cabinet

First Reshuffled Cabinet

Second Reshuffled Cabinet

References

External links 
 List of Ministers of the Kan Cabinet - Prime Minister's Office (Kantei)

Cabinet of Japan
2010 establishments in Japan
2011 disestablishments in Japan
Cabinets established in 2010
Cabinets disestablished in 2011